"Want More Need Less" is the second single from the fourth studio album Gift by alternative rock band Curve. It was released on 3 February 2003 only on CD format and only in Australia.

This single includes three songs from Gift.

Track listing
"Want More Need Less" – 3:59
"My Tiled White Floor" – 5:16
"Bleeding Heart" – 4:07

Credits
 Written by Toni Halliday and Dean Garcia
 Produced, engineered and recorded at Todal Studios by Curve and Ben Grosse at Todal
 Mixed by Ben Grosse at The Mix Room Los Angeles
 Toni Halliday: words, vocals and guitar
 Dean Garcia: bass, guitar, programming and noise
 Kevin Shields: more guitar track 1
 Alan Moulder: more guitar track 3
 Flood: bleeps track 2
 Monti: more drums tracks 1 & 3
 Rob Holliday: more guitar tracks 2 & 3
 Designed by Curve and Paul Agar
 Saucer scan: Wombbaby

References

2003 singles
Curve (band) songs
2001 songs
Songs written by Dean Garcia
Songs written by Toni Halliday